The 2013–14 Latvian Football Cup is the nineteenth season of the Latvian annual football knock-out competition. The winners will qualify for the first qualifying round of the 2014–15 UEFA Europa League.

First round 
The matches of this round took place between 12 and 22 June 2013.

|-
!colspan="3" align="center"|12 June

|-
!colspan="3" align="center"|14 June

|-
!colspan="3" align="center"|15 June

|-
!colspan="3" align="center"|16 June

|-
!colspan="3" align="center"|20 June

|-
!colspan="3" align="center"|22 June

|}

Second round 
The matches of this round took place between 5 and 14 July 2013.

|-
!colspan="3" align="center"|5 July

|-
!colspan="3" align="center"|6 July

|-
!colspan="3" align="center"|7 July

|-
!colspan="3" align="center"|14 July

|}

Third round 
The matches of this round took place between 19 July and 7 September 2013.

|-
!colspan="3" align="center"|19 July

|-
!colspan="3" align="center"|20 July

|-
!colspan="3" align="center"|21 July

|-
!colspan="3" align="center"|6 September

|-
!colspan="3" align="center"|7 September

|}

Quarterfinals 
The matches of this round took place on 4 and 5 April 2014.

|-
!colspan="3" align="center"|4 April

|-
!colspan="3" align="center"|5 April

|}

Semifinals

Final

References

External links 
 LFF.lv

2013-14
2013–14 domestic association football cups
Cup
Cup